Hydrophonia is an album by Swedish progressive rock guitarist Roine Stolt. The album was released 1998.

Track listing
All songs composed by Roine Stolt.
 "Cosmic Lodge" – 7:13
 "Shipbuilding" – 5:51
 "Little Cottage By The Sea" – 4:55
 "Wreck of HMS Nemesis" – 11:55
 "Bizarre Seahorse Sex Attack" – 6:00
 "Oceanna Baby Dolphin" – 3:26
 "Nuclear Nemo" – 6:27
 "Hydrophonia" – 6:11
 "Lobsterland Groove" – 6:19
 "Seafood Kitchen Thing" – 9:25
Sources: and

Personnel
 Jaime Salazar – drums, percussion
 Roine Stolt – bass, guitar, keyboards, percussion
 Ulf Wallander – soprano sax
Production
 Don Azzaro – mixing, producer
 Ingemar Bergman, Stefan Bodin, Lilian Forsberg – photography
 Per Nordin – artwork
 Dexter Frank Jr. – engineer
Sources: and

References

1998 albums
Roine Stolt albums